"Waiting for That Day" is a song performed and largely written by British singer-songwriter George Michael which was released on Epic Records in 1990 in the UK and on Columbia Records in 1991 in the US.

The song was the second single from Michael's second studio album, Listen Without Prejudice Vol. 1 (1990), in the UK, and released as the third single from the album in the US and Australia. "Waiting for That Day" peaked at number 23 in the UK in October 1990 and was followed in the UK by three more singles from the album, all of which peaked slightly lower than that of its predecessor. In the US, the song entered the Billboard Hot 100 on 9 February 1991 and peaked at number 27 on 2 March 1991.

Background
Although Michael wrote the song alone, the chords and rhythm are very similar to The Rolling Stones' "You Can't Always Get What You Want". This title is included at the very end of Michael's song, and a co-writer credit was given to Mick Jagger and Keith Richards.

The song also contains samples from the song "Funky Drummer" by James Brown.

The song did not enjoy great chart success in the United States, becoming Michael's first single to miss the top 10. The single's B-side, "Mother's Pride" achieved some airplay success during the Gulf War. As of October 2017, the single sold 61,000 copies in UK.

Critical reception
Stephen Thomas Erlewine from AllMusic named the song a "highlight" from Listen Without Prejudice Vol. 1. Andrew Mueller from Melody Maker felt it finds "the great chap in devastatingly ineffectual form." Nick Robinson from Music Week wrote, "Possibly one of the singles of the year, this sad plea to a lost love coasts along on a "Funky Drummer" beat and mellow organ backing and ends perfectly with a "You Can't Always Get What You Want" chant. Not only is it a beautiful pop song but it also sees the talented song-writer adding a touch of creativity to a standard dance beat."

Track listing
 7", Epic / GEO 2 (UK)
 "Waiting for That Day" – 4:49
 "Fantasy" – 5:00

Note: also available on MC (Epic / GEO M2) and 12" (Epic / GEO T2)

 CD, Epic / CD GEO 2 (UK)
 "Waiting for That Day" – 4:49
 "Fantasy" – 5:00
 "Father Figure" – 5:36
 "Kissing a Fool" – 4:34

 Cassette and 7", Columbia 73663 (US)
"Waiting for That Day" – 4:49
"Mother's Pride" – 3:59

Charts

Weekly charts

Year-end charts

References

George Michael songs
1990 singles
Songs written by George Michael
Songs written by Jagger–Richards
Song recordings produced by George Michael
Columbia Records singles
Epic Records singles
1990 songs
Pop ballads